ANACS may refer to:
Agence Nationale de l'Aviation Civile et de la Météorologie (Senegal)
ANACS (coin grading company)

See also
ANAC (disambiguation)